Ancient Kings is an Armenian historical drama television series. The series premiered on Armenia Premium on November 5, 2016. The cinematographer of the series is Hrach Manucharyan. The series also was shown on Armenia TV till 26 January 2018.
The series takes place in various places of Armenia.

References

External links

Armenian drama television series
Armenian-language television shows
Armenia TV original programming
2016 Armenian television series debuts
2010s Armenian television series
2017 Armenian television series endings